Hanuman vs Mahiravana  is a 2018 Indian epic adventure 2D and 3D stereoscopic animated film, made by Gamaya Inc, produced by Green Gold Animation Pvt Ltd and distributed by Yash Raj Films. Written by Narayanan Vaidyanathan and directed by Dr. Ezhil Vendan. It is the story of Hanuman and his attempts to free Rama and Lakshmana from the clutches of evil wizard Mahiravana. It focuses on the tale of Hanuman and his biggest battle with Ravana’s youngest step-brother, the king of Patala Mahiravana.

The movie Hanuman vs Mahiravana was released across India in Hindi and Tamil on July 6, 2018. The film was distributed by Yash Raj Films and released in two languages; Hindi and Tamil.

Plot 

It focuses on the tale of Hanuman and his biggest battle with Ravana’s youngest step-brother, the king of Pataala Mahiravana.

Characters 
 Rama (7th incarnation of Bhagavan Maha Vishnu)
 Sita (incarnation of Goddess Maha Lakshmi)
 Lakshmana (incarnation of Anantha/ Sesha Naga (Serpent bed of Maha Vishnu)
 Hanuman (Son of demigod Wind and Avatar of Lord Shiva)
 Sugriva the Vanara king of Kishkintha
 Vibhishana younger brother of Ravana and Kumbha karna
 Ravana mighty king of lanka Rakshasa ruler
 Mahiravana - king of Patala loka
 Sage Tamisra
 Baka
 Taka
 Assassin Commander
 Monkey Soldier Makardhwaja

Reception 
The film received mixed reviews. Cinestaan said that it "fails to make an impact either as an animated adventure, or a retelling of the ancient legend of Mahiravana." The Times of India gave it 2.5/5 stars saying "is worth a watch but don’t go expecting anything that's world class". Glamsham gave it 3/5 stars saying "In spite of its limitations and lack of powers and techniques to fight the animation standards set by the west, HANUMAN VS MAHIRAVANA is still a fair deal of entertainment."

See also
Indian animation industry
List of Indian animated feature films

References

External links 
 
 

Indian animated films
2018 animated films
2018 films
Green Gold Animation
Films distributed by Yash Raj Films
Hindu mythological films
Animated films based on Ramayana
Indian children's films
Hanuman in popular culture